Kalpathi (Kalpathy) Ratholsavam (Kalpathi Chariot Festival) is an annual Hindu Temple festival in the Kalpathy of Palakkad in Kerala state, south India. The festival is at the Sri Visalakshi Sametha Sri Viswanatha Swamy temple where the deities are Lord Siva (Lord Viswanatha) and his consort Visalakshi, another name for Parvati.

The annual ten-day chariot festival conducted here during the month of November is one of the most remarkable festivals of Kerala. Vedic recitals and cultural programmes are held in the temple during the first four days of the festival. This is believed to be over 700 years old. On the last three days, thousands of devotees gather together to draw decorated temple chariots through the streets.

The ancient temple nestles by the banks of the Kalpathy river which is also known as the Nila river. The temple dates back to 1425. The similarities to the famous Varanasi Kashi Vishwanath temple on the banks of the Ganges in North India gives this temple the moniker: kasiyil pakuthi kalpathy—Kalpathy is half Kashi. Kalpathi (Kalpathy), as the village or agraharam in which the temple is situated is known, is an early Tamil Brahmin settlement.

How to get there
 Nearest bus stand: Palakkad Stadium Bus Stand 3 km
 Nearest railway station: Palakkad Junction - 3 km
 Nearest airport: Coimbatore International Airport - 70 km

Kalpathy Viswanatha swamy temple is the oldest Siva temple in Malabar. It was built around 1425 AD.by Kombi Achan, the then Raja of Palakkad. Legend has it that a Brahmin widow named Lakshmiammal went to Banaras and brought Lingam and installed in the present site on the Southern bank of river Neela Bhagirathi. The location of the temple and steps leading to the river brings mind of a visitor the Banaras Temples on the bank of Ganges. Hence this temple is called "Kasiyil Pakuthi Kalpathy" (Half Banaras). 
 
Kalpathy Car Festival is based on vedic Tamil Brahmin culture. The main centre of the festival is Kalpathy Sree Viswanathaswamy temple. The three satellite temples in the village of new Kalpathy, old Kalpathy and Chathapuram also celebrate the festival this period.

The festival is celebrated over a period of 10 days.

The Festival
The festival is conducted over a period of 10 days, usually 8 to 16 November. During this time, 6 chariots (rathas) from 4 temples of Kalpathy come together and circumvent streets of the villages in a grand procession. The 4+2 as follows: main chariot carrying Lord Shiva and additional 2 small chariots for his sons, Ganapathy and Murugan; chariots from the other 3 villages namely New Kalpathy with Lord  Ganapathy, Old Kalpathy with Lord Krishna and Chathapuram with Lord Ganapathy. This is known as 'devarathasamgamam'.

Thousands of devotees converge at Kalpathy and pull the chariot every year.

2005 Pictures

References

External links 

Hindu festivals in Kerala
November observances
Festivals in Palakkad district